Phoxinus  issykkulensis, also known as the Issyk-kul' minnow, is a species of freshwater fish in the family Cyprinidae. It is found in Asia.

References

Phoxinus
Taxa named by Lev Berg
Fish described in 1912